This is a list of Mexican football transfers in the Mexican Primera Division during the summer 2014 transfer window, grouped by club. It only includes football transfers related to clubs from Liga MX, the first division of Mexican football.

Mexican Primera Division

América

In:

Out:

Atlas

In:

Out:

Chiapas

In:

Out:

Cruz Azul

In:

Out:

Guadalajara

In:

Out:

León

In:

Out:

Monterrey

In:

Out:

Morelia

In:

Out:

Pachuca

In:

Out:

Puebla

In:

Out:

Querétaro

In:

Out:

Santos Laguna

In:

Out:

Tijuana

In:

Out:

Toluca

In:

Out:

UANL

In:

Out:

UDG

In:

Out:

UNAM

In:

Out:

Veracruz

In:

Out:

See also 
 2014-15 Liga MX season

References 

Summer 2014
Mexico
Tran
Tran